Pasqualino Morbidelli (1 November 1948 – 21 March 2020) was an Italian boxer. He competed in the men's featherweight event at the 1972 Summer Olympics. At the 1972 Summer Olympics, he defeated Morgan Mwenya and Seyfi Tatar, before losing to Royal Kobayashi.

References

External links
 

1948 births
2020 deaths
Italian male boxers
Olympic boxers of Italy
Boxers at the 1972 Summer Olympics
Boxers from Rome
Mediterranean Games bronze medalists for Italy
Mediterranean Games medalists in boxing
Competitors at the 1971 Mediterranean Games
Featherweight boxers
20th-century Italian people
21st-century Italian people